Equal Suffrage League may refer to:

 College Equal Suffrage League
 Equal Suffrage League (Brooklyn)
 Equal Suffrage League (St. Louis)
 Equal Suffrage League of Virginia (1909–1920)